Dellwood is a city in Washington County, Minnesota, United States and a suburb of St. Paul.  The population was 1,063 at the 2010 census.

History
Dellwood was platted in 1882.

Geography
Minnesota State Highway 96 serves as a main route in the community.

Demographics

Dellwood consistently ranks as the wealthiest city in Minnesota and among the 25 wealthiest cities in the country.

2010 census
As of the census of 2010, there were 1,063 people, 372 households, and 319 families living in the city. The racial makeup of the city was 96.7% White, 0.4% African American, 0.1% Native American, 1.7% Asian, 0.1% Pacific Islander, 0.1% from other races, and 0.9% from two or more races. Hispanic or Latino of any race were 2.0% of the population.

There were 372 households, of which 40.3% had children under the age of 18 living with them, 79.0% were married couples living together, 3.5% had a female householder with no husband present, 3.2% had a male householder with no wife present, and 14.2% were non-families. 12.4% of all households were made up of individuals, and 6.8% had someone living alone who was 65 years of age or older. The average household size was 2.85 and the average family size was 3.13.

The median age in the city was 46.1 years. 28.9% of residents were under the age of 18; 4.9% were between the ages of 18 and 24; 14.5% were from 25 to 44; 38.2% were from 45 to 64; and 13.5% were 65 years of age or older. The gender makeup of the city was 51.3% male and 48.7% female.

2000 census
As of the census of 2000, there were 1,033 people, 353 households, and 304 families living in the city. The racial makeup of the city was 98.26% White, 0.48% African American, 0.10% Native American, 0.77% Asian, 0.29% from other races, and 0.10% from two or more races. Hispanic or Latino of any race were 0.87% of the population.

There were 353 households, out of which 42.8% had children under the age of 18 living with them, 80.7% were married couples living together, 3.4% had a female householder with no husband present, and 13.6% were non-families. 10.8% of all households were made up of individuals, and 3.7% had someone living alone who was 65 years of age or older.  The average household size was 2.93 and the average family size was 3.16.

In the city, the population was spread out, with 29.7% under the age of 18, 5.3% from 18 to 24, 18.6% from 25 to 44, 37.0% from 45 to 64, and 9.4% who were 65 years of age or older.  The median age was 44 years. For every 100 females, there were 99.0 males.  For every 100 females age 18 and over, there were 96.2 males.

The median income for a household in the city was $129,136, and the median income for a family was $133,717. Males had a median income of $84,792 versus $50,625 for females. The per capita income for the city was $61,592.  About 1.6% of families and 1.9% of the population were below the poverty line, including 3.3% of those under age 18 and 1.4% of those age 65 or over.

Notable people
Notable residents of Dellwood include the late Herb Brooks, coach of the Miracle on Ice hockey team; the late F. Scott Fitzgerald; and Jesse Ventura, former Independent Governor of Minnesota and Pro Wrestler.

References

External links

Cities in Minnesota
Cities in Washington County, Minnesota